Billy Harris (born 25 January 1995) is a British tennis player.

Harris has a career high ATP singles ranking of 290 achieved on 3 October 2022. He also has a career high doubles ranking of 349 achieved on 3 October 2022.

Harris has won 1 ATP Challenger doubles title at the 2022 Winnipeg National Bank Challenger with Kelsey Stevenson.

Challenger and World Tennis Tour Finals

Singles: 10 (5–5)

Doubles: 14 (8–6)

References

External links
 
 

1995 births
Living people
British male tennis players
Sportspeople from Nottingham
21st-century British people
English male tennis players
Tennis people from Nottinghamshire